Servílio Sebastião de Oliveira (born May 6, 1948 in São Paulo) is a former Brazilian Olympic bronze medalist . In 1968, he became the first Brazilian boxer ever to win an Olympic medal.  It occurred at the 1968 Summer Olympics in Mexico City. An eye injury forced his retirement from professional boxing. He made a comeback and won two bouts in 1977, then re-retired with a record of 19–0.

Boxing trainer
He became a boxing trainer for other Brazilian boxers such as Adailton "Precipício" de Jesus and IBF Featherweight Champion Valdemir Pereira.

Exhibitions
Oliveira has occasionally come out of retirement to fight exhibitions. The best known of these was the three round exhibition he fought in 1996 with Éder Jofre.

Personal life
Oliveira's son Gabriel is the boxing coach of American Top Team.

Professional boxing record

References

External links

1948 births
Sportspeople from São Paulo
Flyweight boxers
Olympic boxers of Brazil
Boxers at the 1968 Summer Olympics
Olympic bronze medalists for Brazil
Living people
Olympic medalists in boxing
Brazilian male boxers
Medalists at the 1968 Summer Olympics
20th-century Brazilian people
21st-century Brazilian people